is a PlayStation 3 game developed by Artdink and published by Sony Computer Entertainment. A Japanese version was released in Japan and South East Asia on September 25, 2008. A translated English and Chinese version (Aquanaut's Holiday ~堡礁秘辛~) was released in Hong Kong, South Korea, Taiwan and South East Asia on November 20, 2008.

History
Aquanaut's Holiday: Kakusareta Kiroku was previously known as Aqua which was the title used in the Tokyo Game Show 2007 official teaser.

This PlayStation 3 release is the latest installment in Artdink's Aquanaut's Holiday game series which started on the PlayStation in 1995.

Gameplay
The actual story mode of the game can be compared to an adventure game. The main - unnamed - character is a journalist, in search of the missing oceanographer William "Bill" Graber. Using a submarine called the Dolphin no.2 you explore the seas for clues.

The game takes place in Kisira Atoll, in Polynesia. An oceanographic research facility named Kisira Base is the starting point and where you always come back to, for supplies (such as batteries for sonar navigation buoys) and equipment.

Two scientists work at the base, the young and dreamy Jessica Porter and the conservative chief Robert Kemelman.
Both assist you in solving mysteries, each in their own way. Jessica likes to believe fairytales and legends, while Robert usually comes up with a scientific explanation.

All the fish, animals and other discoveries are added to a database. Some fish can communicate and the player has to repeat the sounds made by a fish, using the four trigger buttons of the Sixaxis controller.

At all times, the unlocked area of the map is free to explore as you like.

English version
The game is currently only available in Japan and South East Asia (Hong Kong, Taiwan and Singapore), however the Asian version was re-released in November 2008 with Chinese and English languages replacing the original Japanese.  Given the fairly simple gameplay, the English version is understandable for teens and older players, but young children may be confused by the significant Engrish evident in the translation. The English-language version is also available in Korea.

Reception
Aquanaut's Holiday: Hidden Memories entered the Japanese sales charts at number 9, selling 18,000 units. The game received a score of 32 out of 40 by Famitsu magazine.

See also
Afrika

References

External links
Official website (China)
Official website (Korea)
Tokyo Game Show 2007 teaser

2008 video games
Artdink games
PlayStation 3-only games
Sony Interactive Entertainment games
Submarine simulation video games
PlayStation 3 games
Japan-exclusive video games
Video games developed in Japan
Video games scored by Hideki Sakamoto
Single-player video games